Zonzon is a district and a village community in Zangon Kataf Local Government Area, southern Kaduna state in the Middle Belt region of Nigeria. The postal code for the area is 802138.

Settlements
 The following are some major settlements in Zonzon district include:
 Apyia Babum
 Aza Akat
 Chen Akoo
 Fabwang (H. Ung. Tabo)
 Kati (H. Wawa-Rafi)
 Mabukhwu
 Makunanshyia
 Makutsatim
 Manyi Sansak
 Mashan
 Masong
 Mawuka
 Mawukili
 Sakum
 Taligan (I, II)
 Zonzon

Demographics
The people of Zonzon district are primarily Atyap people, with settlers from other parts of Nigeria in its major towns.

Notable people
 Engr. Andrew Yakubu Laah, engineer
 Atyoli Bala Achi (late), historian, writer
 Agwam Dominic Gambo Yahaya (KSM), Agwatyap III
 AVM Ishaya Aboi Shekari (rtd.), military officer

See also
 Atyap chiefdom
 Jei District
 Kanai, Nigeria
 List of villages in Kaduna State

References

Populated places in Kaduna State
Atyap chiefdom